Sanee Rohana Kodithuvakku (born 15 February 1961) is a Sri Lankan politician and member of the Parliament of Sri Lanka. He belongs to the Sri Lanka Freedom Party.

References

Members of the 14th Parliament of Sri Lanka
Sri Lanka Freedom Party politicians
Living people
1961 births